The Last Eve is a 2005 action film directed by Young Man Kang, a Korean-born filmmaker who made his U.S. directing debut Cupid's Mistake (2001).

Plot
This film is journeying backwards through history while telling, re-telling and re-imagining the story of Adam and Eve. This film consists of three contrasting tales Eve's Secret, Cain and Abel and Snake's Temptation, which reveal the dark tragedies at the heart of all romance, the temptations of the flesh and the spirit, the loss of innocence.

Production and release
The Last Eve was shot in Death Valley, Los Angeles Korea town and South Korea. The Los Angeles filming was executive produced by Kimmarie Johnson. It took 2 years to complete the film.

The film won the Best Action Feature film Award at the 2005 New York International Independent Film and Video Festival.

Reviews
The Last Eve at the Film Threat the 10 Best Unseen Films of 2005 
Phil Hall of Film Threat, reviewing it "this can be described as the world’s first avant-garde theological martial arts love story. Taking the story of Western civilization’s first eviction recipients and spinning it across a bizarre variety of unlikely landscapes, the immensely gifted filmmaker Young Man Kang has brought forth a production which is so astonishing and original than it is impossible to compare it to anything that has ever been made."  

This film released on DVD on August 26, 2008 by Vanguard Cinema

Awards

Won
 New York International Independent Film and Video Festival:
 Best Action Feature Film Award (Young Man Kang)
 New York B Movie Film Festival:
 Best Cinematography (Young Man Kang)

References

External links
 

2005 films
2005 action films
American martial arts films
2005 martial arts films
Films directed by Young Man Kang
2000s American films